Babak or Babek may refer to:

People
 Papak or Babak (c. 222), Persian prince and father (or stepfather) of Ardashir I, founder of the Sasanian Empire
 Babak (Sasanian general) (6th century)
 Babak Khorramdin (c. 795/798 – 838), Iranian rebel leader

Places
 Babek (city), Babek Rayon, Nakhchivan Autonomous Republic, Azerbaijan
 Babek Rayon, Nakhchivan Autonomous Republic, Azerbaijan
 Babak, Ardabil, a village in Ardabil Province, Iran
 Babak, Hormozgan, a village in Hormozgan Province, Iran
 Babak Fort or Babak Castle, northwestern Iran
 Shahr-e Babak County, Kerman Province, Iran
 Shahr-e Babak, capital of the county
 Babak River, a river in Lombok, Indonesia

Other uses
 Babak (given name)
 Babek (film), a 1979 Azerbaijani film
 Babek (ballet), a ballet by Agshin Alizadeh

See also
 Bibek
 Bobak